The Whitefish River is an  river on the Upper Peninsula of the U.S. state of Michigan.

The east branch rises out of Trout Lake in southwest Alger County. The west branch rises in southeast Marquette County.

References

See also
Laughing Whitefish River, which flows north through Alger County

Rivers of Michigan
Rivers of Alger County, Michigan
Rivers of Delta County, Michigan
Rivers of Marquette County, Michigan
Tributaries of Lake Michigan
Wild and Scenic Rivers of the United States